February 6 - Eastern Orthodox liturgical calendar – February 8

All fixed commemorations below are observed on February 20 by Eastern Orthodox Churches on the Old Calendar.

For February 7th, Orthodox Churches on the Old Calendar commemorate the Saints listed on January 25.

Feasts

 Afterfeast of the Meeting of our Lord in the Temple.

Saints

 Martyr Agathangelus, in Damascus (3rd century)
 The 1,003 Martyrs of Nicomedia (303)
 Martyr Theopemptus and the Six Martyrs of Phrygia, by fire (c. 305)
 Martyr Audatus (Adaucus), in Phrygia (4th century)
 Saint Parthenius, Bishop of Lampsacus on the Hellespont (4th century)
 Saint Mastridia of Jerusalem, woman ascetic of the desert (c. 580)
 Venerable Luke the Younger (Luke of Mt. Steiris, Luke Thaumaturgus, Luke of Hellas), founder of the Monastery of Hosios Loukas (946 or 953)
 Saint Aprionus of Cyprus, Bishop.
 Venerable Peter of Monovatia, ascetic.
 Venerable Sarapion of Cyprus.

Pre-Schism Western saints

 Hieromartyr Augulus (Avgul, Augurius, Aule), Bishop of Augusta, Britain (c. 303)
 Saint Chrysolius, an Armenian who enlightened the north-east of France, where he became bishop and was martyred (4th century)
 Saint Juliana of Bologna (435)
 Saint Anatolius, Bishop of Cahors in France (5th century?)
 Saint Laurence of Siponto, called Majoranus, Bishop of Siponto in Italy, who built the church of St Michael on Mt. Gargano (c. 546)
 Saint Tressan (Trésain), a missionary from Ireland, he was ordained priest by St Remigius, and preached in Mareuil on the Marne in France (550)
 Saint Fidelis, Bishop of Mérida (c. 570)
 Saint Meldon (Medon), from Ireland, he became a hermit in France and reposed at Péronne (6th century)
 Saint Ronan (Ronane, Roman), Bishop of Kilmaronen (7th century)
 Saint Richard the Pilgrim (Richard of Wessex), King and Confessor, father of Saints Willibald, Wunnibald and Walburga (720)
 Saint Amulwinus, Bishop of Lobbes in Belgium and the successor of St Erminus (c. 750)

Post-Schism Orthodox saints

 Saint Euthymius, monk of Glinsk Hermitage (1866)
 New Martyr George of Alikianos on Crete, by beheading (1867)
 Venerable Boniface, Abbot, of Theofania, Kiev (1871)

New martyrs and confessors

 New Hieromartyr Alexander Talizin, Priest (1938)
 New Hieromartyr Barlaam (Ryashentsev), Archbishop of Perm (1942)
 New Hieromartyr Alexis, Priest (1942)

Other commemorations

 Repose of Archimandrite Gennadius, ascetic of the Roslavl Forests (1826), and commemoration of his disciple, Abramius, desert-dweller of Whitehoof Convent (1868), and the latter’s spiritual daughter Abbess Alexandra (1883)
 Repose of Archimandrite Cyril (Pavlov) of St. Sergius Lavra, confessor to patriarchs Alexy II, Alexy I and Pimen (2017)

Icon gallery

Notes

References

Sources
 February 7 / 20. Orthodox Calendar (Pravoslavie.ru).
 February 20 / 7. Holy Trinity Russian Orthodox Church (A parish of the Patriarchate of Moscow).
 February 7. OCA - The Lives of the Saints.
 The Autonomous Orthodox Metropolia of Western Europe and the Americas. St. Hilarion Calendar of Saints for the year of our Lord 2004. St. Hilarion Press (Austin, TX). p. 13.
 The Seventh Day of the Month of February. Orthodoxy in China.
 February 7. Latin Saints of the Orthodox Patriarchate of Rome.
 The Roman Martyrology. Transl. by the Archbishop of Baltimore. Last Edition, According to the Copy Printed at Rome in 1914. Revised Edition, with the Imprimatur of His Eminence Cardinal Gibbons. Baltimore: John Murphy Company, 1916. pp. 40–41.
 Rev. Richard Stanton. A Menology of England and Wales, or, Brief Memorials of the Ancient British and English Saints Arranged According to the Calendar, Together with the Martyrs of the 16th and 17th Centuries. London: Burns & Oates, 1892. pp. 55–58.
Greek Sources
 Great Synaxaristes:  7 Φεβρουαρίου. Μεγασ Συναξαριστησ.
  Συναξαριστής. 7 Φεβρουαρίου. Ecclesia.gr. (H Εκκλησια Τησ Ελλαδοσ).
Russian Sources
  20 февраля (7 февраля). Православная Энциклопедия под редакцией Патриарха Московского и всея Руси Кирилла (электронная версия). (Orthodox Encyclopedia - Pravenc.ru).

February in the Eastern Orthodox calendar